Tribute to the Gods is a covers album by heavy metal band Iced Earth. It is notable as the last Iced Earth album featuring Larry Tarnowski on lead guitar, and the last featuring singer Matt Barlow on vocals until his 2007 return. It was also their last album with Century Media until they returned to the label in 2010. This record was first released in 2001 in the box set Dark Genesis, but was re-released as a standalone disc in 2002. It was then re-released as part of the set Enter the Realm of the Gods along with the band's 1989 demo Enter the Realm in 2008 with new cover artwork.

Track listing

Personnel
 Jon Schaffer − rhythm guitar, vocals on "God of Thunder"
 Matt Barlow − vocals
 Larry Tarnowski − lead guitar
 James MacDonough − bass guitar
 Richard Christy − drums

 Additional personnel
 Jim Morris - guitar solo on "God of Thunder" and "Dead Babies" and backing vocals

References 

2001 albums
Iced Earth albums
Century Media Records albums
Albums with cover art by Travis Smith (artist)
Covers albums